Theodore Frederick Schroeder (September 3, 1902 – April 30, 1979) was an American politician in the state of Washington. He served in the Washington State Senate and Washington House of Representatives. From 1951 to 1953, he was President pro tempore of the Senate.

References

1902 births
1979 deaths
Democratic Party Washington (state) state senators
20th-century American politicians
Democratic Party members of the Washington House of Representatives